The 1981 All-Ireland Senior Football Championship was the 95th staging of the All-Ireland Senior Football Championship, the Gaelic Athletic Association's premier inter-county Gaelic football tournament. The championship began on 10 May 1981 and ended on 20 September 1981.

Kerry entered the championship as the defending champions and were hoping to win a record-equalling fourth successive championship title. 

On 20 September 1981, Kerry won the championship following a 1-12 to 0-8 defeat of Offaly in the All-Ireland final. This was their 27th All-Ireland title and their fourth championship in succession.

Offaly's Matt Connor was the championship's top scorer with 1-31. Kerry's Jack O'Shea was the choice for Texaco Footballer of the Year.

Munster Championship format change

The normal system of 2 Quarter-final's and 2 Semi-final's is back.

Results

Connacht Senior Football Championship

Quarter-finals

Semi-finals

Final

Leinster Senior Football Championship

First round

   
     
  

Quarter-finals

Semi-finals

Final

Munster Senior Football Championship

Quarter-finals

Semi-finals

Final

Ulster Senior Football Championship

Preliminary round

Quarter-finals

Semi-finals

Final

All-Ireland Senior Football Championship

Semi-finals

Final

Championship statistics

Top scorers

Overall

Single game

Miscellaneous

 London after six years in the Connacht championship play their games this year on home ground at Ruislip.
 Mayo won their first Connacht title since 1969.
 Kerry become the third team in the history of the championship to win four All-Ireland titles in-a-row. They equalled the record set by Wexford (1915-1918) and Kerry (1929-1932).

References